The Émilie Palace is a high-rise residential building in Monaco.

Location
It is located at 3 Avenue Princesse Grace in the Larvotto district of Monaco. It faces the Japanese Botanical Garden of Monaco.

History
It was built with concrete and designed in the modernist architectural style. It is 38.35 metre high, with twelve storeys. The building is mostly residential. However, it is also home to some shops and an art gallery.

It was owned by heiress Hélène Pastor through her eponymous real estate company.

References

Residential buildings in Monaco
Modernist architecture in Monaco
Pastor family